Poraj  is a village in Myszków County, Silesian Voivodeship, in southern Poland. It is the seat of the gmina (administrative district) called Gmina Poraj.

The village has a population of 4,000.

References

External links 
 Jewish Community in Poraj on Virtual Shtetl

Villages in Myszków County